The Morningside Australian Football Club, also known as the Morningside Panthers, is an Australian rules football club based at Jack Esplen Oval in the suburb of Hawthorne in Brisbane. The club consists of Masters, Amateurs, Women's, Junior and Senior football sections.
Its senior team competed in the North East Australian Football League (NEAFL) competition from 2011 to 2013 and now is a member club of the Queensland Australian Football League. Its junior sides compete in the AFL Brisbane Juniors (AFLBJ) competition. The club also caters for young girls and boys by running Auskick skills clinics, which are held at the beginning of the season and do not involve competitive games.

Morningside Football Club has operated successfully as a football club in Brisbane for over 50 years and is one of the most widely recognised Queensland based AFL clubs within Australia. It developed from the Hawthorne Juniors club which was founded in 1931.

Recent history
At the beginning of the 2000 season the members of both clubs voted unanimously to join and form one united club. This decision was made to strengthen the club socially, financially and to improve the junior player development programmes and created a player path to the elite AFLQ State League competition.

Morningside has provided some of the best Queensland-bred Australian rules footballers of the last 50 years, including triple-premiership winning Brisbane Lions captain Michael Voss and his teammate fullback Mal Michael, Voss's brother Brett Voss (who played at Brisbane and St Kilda). Current players include dashing half-back Courtenay Dempsey of Essendon, the left-footed in-and-under midfielder David Armitage of St Kilda and recently debuted Tom Bell of Carlton, nicknamed the next "Kouta" referring to Blues legend Anthony Koutoufides.

At the beginning of 2011, the QAFL was merged to form the "North-East Australian Football League", combining Sydney and Canberra teams with the best QAFL teams, including the Northern Territory Thunder, Gold Coast Suns, GWS and Sydney Swans reserves team all compete in the competition as well as the Brisbane Lions reserves. There are two conferences with Morningside playing in the Northern Conference alongside fellow rivals Mt Gravat and Southport, among others.

In the NEAFL's inaugural year, Morningside played Northern Territory in the Northern Conference Final, in which they were beaten by 87 points. Northern Territory went on to beat Eastern champion Ainslie.

Honours 
 AFL Queensland (10): 1965, 1991, 1993, 1994, 2003, 2004, 2009, 2010, 2014, 2020

Grand Finals detail

Individual

Grogan Medallists 
The Grogan Medal is awarded to the best and fairest player in an AFLQ season.

Noel McGuinness 1953
Henry Maguire 1955
Keith Farnsworth 1957
Merv Dihm 1960
Terry Johnston 1967
Jeff Ebert 1974
John Blair 1982
Daryl Bourke 1989 & 1993
Ricky Chapman 1992
Mitchell Howe 1994
Dean Edwards 1998
Jacob Gough 2003
Nathan Kinch 2008
Matthew Payne 2020

QAFL Top Goalkickers 
Gary Jones (114) – 1974
Gary Jones (124) – 1975
Gary Jones (142) – 1976
J. Newton (81) – 1979
J. Blair (86) – 1985
J. Manson (106) – 1986
Darren Vickery (95) – 1989
Darren Vickery (117) – 1990
Darren Vickery (100) – 1991
Darren Vickery (81) – 1992
M. Russell (83) – 1994
M. Russell (105) – 1995
M. Russell (101) – 1997
Matthew Hammelmann (34) – 2020

AFL/VFL players
There is a list of past and present Morningside players who have played at AFL/VFL:

Jackson Allen (Gold Coast)
David Armitage (St. Kilda)
Tom Bell (Carlton and Brisbane Lions)
John Blair (South Melbourne, Fitzroy and St. Kilda)
Daryl Bourke (Melbourne)
Jordon Bourke (Brisbane Lions)
Scott Clouston (Brisbane Lions)
Keidean Coleman (Brisbane Lions)
Blake Coleman (Brisbane Lions)
Courtenay Dempsey (Essendon)
Barry Denny (Melbourne)
Terry Devery (Footscray)
Merv Dihm (St. Kilda)
Brad Edwards (Fitzroy and Brisbane Bears)
Matthew Hammelmann (Brisbane Lions)
Scott Harding (Brisbane Lions and Port Adelaide)
Jack Henry (Essendon)
Tom Hickey (Gold Coast and St. Kilda)
Warren Jones (Carlton and St. Kilda)
Ben Keays (Brisbane Lions and Adelaide)
Will Ashcroft (Brisbane Lions)
Stephen Kenna (Carlton)
Tony Lynn (Brisbane Lions and Carlton)
Mal Michael (Collingwood, Brisbane Lions and Essendon)
Rick Norman (North Melbourne and Brisbane Bears)
Paul Peos (West Coast Eagles and Brisbane Bears)
Tony Smith (Sydney Swans)
Lee Spurr (Fremantle)
Howard Tarpey (South Melbourne)
Gavin Urquhart (North Melbourne)
Brett Voss (Brisbane Lions and St. Kilda)
Michael Voss (Brisbane Bears and Brisbane Lions)
John Waddington (North Melbourne)
David Wearne (Brisbane Bears)
John Williams (Essendon)
Tom Williams (Western Bulldogs)
Peter Yagmoor (Collingwood)

References

External links

Official website
AustralianFootball.com club profile

Morningside
Australian rules football clubs in Brisbane
1947 establishments in Australia
Australian rules football clubs established in 1947